Tiruchirappalli Fort Railway Station is a Railway station which once served that citizens of the dilapidated fort of Old City of Trichy encompassing Big Bazaar Street, Singarathope, Bishop Heber School, Teppakulam and Tiruchirapalli Rock Fort. All that which remains now is a railway station with that name and Main Guard Gate along West Boulevard Road in the city of Tiruchirappalli in Tamil Nadu, India. Tiruchirapalli Fort Railway Station lies opposite the Main Guard Gate and Tiruchirapalli Town Station lies towards its Eastern Entrance. It comes under the jurisdiction of Tiruchirappalli railway division of Southern railway zone.

External links
 
 https://www.railyatri.in/stations/tiruchirappalli-fort-tp

Railway stations in Tiruchirappalli